Eugenia A. Wordsworth-Stevenson (died October 30, 2009) was a Liberian diplomat. She was ambassador to the United States.

She was a sponsor of Transafrica.

References 

2009 deaths
Liberian diplomats
Ambassadors of Liberia to the United States
Year of birth missing